Varanus zugorum, also known commonly as the silver monitor or Zugs' monitor, is a species of monitor lizard in the family Varanidae. The species is endemic to the island of Halmahera in the Moluccas, in Indonesia.

Etymology
The specific name, zugorum (genitive, plural), is in honor of American herpetologist George R. Zug and his wife Patricia.

Geographic range
V. zugorum is only known with certainty from its type locality in the vicinity of Jailolo. Reasonably reliable local eyewitness accounts exist from Akesahu (lower western side of Kao Bay) and Labi Labi (northeast Halmahera).

Taxonomy
Zugs' monitor was described from a juvenile museum specimen originally labeled as Varanus indicus. At least one or two specimens resembling the type specimen and generally agreed to represent this species have been imported at various times for the pet trade. Other than this however, the species is unknown. Its habits are unknown as it has not been observed in the wild and is rarely seen even by natives.

Conservation status
V. zugorum is among the 25 “most wanted lost” species that are the focus of Global Wildlife Conservation's “Search for Lost Species” initiative.

Description
The body and limbs are patternless save for scattered bluish scales. The tail is mostly patternless except for a dozen faint dark bands towards the tip. The underside is yellowish and unpatterned. The tongue is dark purplish with a pink base.

References

Varanus
Reptiles of Indonesia
Endemic fauna of Indonesia
Fauna of Halmahera
Reptiles described in 2005
Taxa named by Wolfgang Böhme (herpetologist)
Taxa named by Thomas Ziegler (zoologist)